Easterlittens is a village in Leeuwarden in the province of Friesland, the Netherlands. It had a population of around 439 in January 2017.

History
The village was first mentioned in the second half of the 13th century as Lechinke. The etymology is unclear. Easterlittens is a terp (artificial living mound) village which developed along the Franekervaart. The terp has been partially excavated at the end of the 19th century. The Dutch Reformed Church has 12th century elements. The tower dates from 1854. The little tower was blown off the church in a storm in 1969, and was restored and put back in 1971, but without the original bell which could not be found and was replaced by a ship's bell. In 1840, Easterlittens was home to 479 people.

The windmill Alde Swarte Molen, Easterlittens is a polder mill from 1690. It used to drain excess water until 1961 when it was rendered obsolete by an electric pumping station. In 1967, it was bought by the municipality of Baarderadeel for ƒ 1,-. Since 1981, the wind mill is back in active service draining the polder of Oosterlittens-Britswerd.

Before 2018, the village was part of the Littenseradiel municipality and before 1984 it belonged to Baarderadeel municipality.

Gallery

References

External links

Leeuwarden
Populated places in Friesland